Peripheral nerve stimulation may refer to:

 Occipital nerve stimulation
 A type of electroanalgesia